Anstenoptilia hugoiella is a moth of the family Pterophoridae. It is known from Brazil, Colombia, Ecuador, Peru and Venezuela.

The wingspan is 18–20 mm. Adults are on wing in February, March and August.

External links

Platyptiliini
Moths described in 1996
Taxa named by Cees Gielis